Radimisht is a small village in the Korçë County, southeastern Albania, with approximately three houses currently populated. It is part of the former municipality Barmash. At the 2015 local government reform it became part of the municipality Kolonjë. Inside the village, there are several houses and the remains of an old church. The village was created after the Ottoman invasion of southern Albania, as Christian Albanian villagers moved north to escape persecution. There are no paved roads to the village, and it can only be reached by animal rides (donkey, horse) or off-road vehicles.

References

Populated places in Kolonjë, Korçë
Villages in Korçë County